Maria Eduarda de Carvalho (born 11 March 1983) is a Brazilian actress and writer.

Selected filmography
Television
 2007 - Paraíso Tropical - Odete
 2008 - Três Irmãs - Carminha
 2009 - Tudo Novo de Novo - Nanda
 2011 - A Vida da Gente - Fernanda Macedo
 2012 - Lado a Lado - Eliete
 2012 - Como Aproveitar o Fim do Mundo - Silvia
 2014 - Em Família - Vanessa
 2015 - Sete Vidas - Laila Thompson
 2018 - O Tempo Não Para - Miss Celine

References

External links

1982 births
Living people
Brazilian television actresses
Brazilian telenovela actresses